Nicoletta Braschi  (born 19 April 1960) is an Italian actress and producer, best known for her work with her husband, actor and director Roberto Benigni.

Life and career
Born in Cesena, Braschi studied in Rome's Academy of Dramatic Arts where she first met Benigni in 1980. Her first film was with Benigni in 1983, the comedy Tu Mi Turbi (You Upset Me). She later appeared in two Jim Jarmusch films, Down by Law and Mystery Train.

Braschi's two most successful collaborations with her husband were Johnny Stecchino (1992) and La Vita è Bella (Life is Beautiful) (1997). The first, an Italian comedy that cast the actress as the girlfriend of a mobster (Benigni), was a huge hit in Italy, while the second, in which Braschi played the wife of an Italian Jew (Benigni) imprisoned in a concentration camp, was a widely praised success that launched both Braschi and her husband into the international spotlight. She was nominated for a Screen Actors Guild award as a cast member of that film.

In 1997, Braschi starred in Ovosodo as a depressed teacher encouraging a student to work and study harder. The film won her a David di Donatello award (Italy's equivalent of the Oscars) and much praise from critics and the public.

In 2002, she was a member of the jury at the 52nd Berlin Film Festival.

In 2005, she starred in and produced The Tiger and the Snow (La tigre e la neve) a love story set during the initial stage of the Iraq War. This was her last film appearance until the 2018 film Happy as Lazzaro.

In 2010, she toured the Italian theatres starring in Tradimenti, based on Harold Pinter's play Betrayal.

In 2013, she was a member of the Cinéfondation and short films jury at the 66th Cannes Film Festival.

Filmography

External links

 

1960 births
20th-century Italian actresses
21st-century Italian actresses
Italian film actresses
People from Cesena
Living people
Accademia Nazionale di Arte Drammatica Silvio D'Amico alumni
David di Donatello winners
Ciak d'oro winners